Greeneville Commons is a shopping center located in Greeneville, Tennessee along US Route 11E and US Route 11E Business.
Greeneville Commons is the largest shopping complex in Greeneville. It is anchored by Belk, Hobby Lobby, Ross, and Burke's Outlet with Hibbett Sports as a junior anchor. JCPenney closed on July 31, 2017.

History
The shopping center opened in 1990 and was originally anchored by Parks-Belk, JCPenney, Goody's Family Clothing and Kmart. Parks-Belk became Proffitt's in 1995, and later became Belk in 2006, Goody's closed in 2009 and became Burke's Outlet in 2010. JCPenney closed on July 31, 2017. Ross moved into the former JCPenney building. Kmart closed on April 24, 2018. Marshalls, Hobby Lobby and Five Below moved into the former Kmart building in 2019.

References

External links

Buildings and structures in Greene County, Tennessee
Greeneville, Tennessee
Shopping malls in Tennessee
Shopping malls established in 1980